"I Am Beautiful" is the debut single and coronation song from American recording artist and American Idol season 12 winner, Candice Glover. The song was co-written by Joleen Belle and Jaden Michaels, and co-produced by Roahn Hylton and John Lock.

Her recording of "I Am Beautiful" was released as a single on May 16, 2013. An acoustic version of the song appeared on her debut album, Music Speaks as a bonus track. The original is not included on the album.

Live performances
Glover first performed the song on the season's final performance night on May 15, 2013, and then again on the finale after she was declared the winner. Glover then performed the single on The Tonight Show with Jay Leno the following night. On May 20, 2013, Glover performed on Live! with Kelly and Michael.

Track listing

Chart performance
In its first week of release, the single sold 48,000 copies in the US. The song debuted at No. 5 on the R&B Digital Songs chart, No. 6 on the Heatseekers Songs chart, No. 33 on the Hot R&B/Hip-Hop Songs chart and No. 93 on the Hot 100. At the time, it was the lowest charting Idol winner single in history, until Caleb Johnson's "As Long as You Love Me" failed to enter the Hot 100.

Charts

Release history

References

2013 songs
2013 singles
American Idol songs
Pop ballads
Contemporary R&B ballads
Songs written by Joleen Belle
19 Recordings singles
Interscope Records singles
Songs written by Jaden Michaels